Carr's Hall was a historic commercial building located at Terre Haute, Vigo County, Indiana. It was built in 1857, and was a two-story, Italianate style brick building.  It featured a cast iron storefront on the first story and elaborated pedimented window surrounds on the second.  It was one of Terre Haute's oldest buildings.  It has been demolished.

It was listed on the National Register of Historic Places in 1983.

References

Commercial buildings on the National Register of Historic Places in Indiana
Italianate architecture in Indiana
Commercial buildings completed in 1857
Buildings and structures in Terre Haute, Indiana
National Register of Historic Places in Terre Haute, Indiana
1857 establishments in Indiana